The 4th AVN Awards ceremony, organized by Adult Video News (AVN), took place on January 9, 1987 at the Tropicana Hotel Grand Ballroom in Paradise, Nevada. During the ceremony, AVN Awards were presented in 32 categories honoring excellence in the world of adult movies released on videocassette between January 1 and December 31, 1986. The show was hosted by Adult Video News co-publishers Paul Fishbein and Barry Rosenblatt.

The Best Shot-on-Video Feature, Blame It on Ginger won the most awards, with three. Star Angel also won three, however, Devil in Miss Jones Part 3: A New Beginning won Best Picture.

Winners and nominees

The nominees for the 4th AVN Awards were announced in the January 1987 issue of Adult Video News magazine. Devil in Miss Jones Part 3: A New Beginning led all nominees with 11.

The winners were announced during the awards ceremony on January 9, 1987.

Awards

Winners are listed first, highlighted in boldface, and indicated with a double dagger.

Honorary AVN Awards

Hall of Fame
AVN Hall of Fame inductees for 1987 were not announced at the awards ceremony, but rather were announced later in the June 1987 issue of Adult Video News magazine.

Multiple nominations and awards

The following movies received the most nominations:

The following nine movies received multiple awards:

Presenters

The following individuals were among those who presented awards: Amber Lynn, Sharon Mitchell, Bionca.

See also

 AVN Award for Best Actress
 AVN Award for Best Supporting Actress
 AVN Award for Male Performer of the Year
 AVN Award for Male Foreign Performer of the Year
 AVN Award for Female Foreign Performer of the Year
 AVN Female Performer of the Year Award
 List of members of the AVN Hall of Fame

References

Bibliography

External links
 
 Adult Video News Awards at the Internet Movie Database

AVN Awards
1986 film awards
AVN Awards 4